Marcou is a surname. Notable people with the surname include:

Alex Marcou (born 1958), Australian rules footballer
James Marcou (born 1988), American ice hockey player
Jules Marcou (1824–1898), French, Swiss, and American geologist

See also
Marcos (given name)